Kahletown is an unincorporated community in Jefferson County, in the U.S. state of Pennsylvania.

History
John Kahle was a schoolteacher at Kahletown in the 1830s.

References

Unincorporated communities in Jefferson County, Pennsylvania
Unincorporated communities in Pennsylvania